Pyrrhus, Pyrrhos or Pyrros may refer to:

People
 Pyrrhus of Epirus (318–272 BC), king of Epirus, after whom the term Pyrrhic victory was named
 Pyrrhus II of Epirus (fl. late 3rd century BC), brother of Ptolemy of Epirus 
 Pyrrhus of Athens (fl. 5th century BC), Athenian sculptor
 Pyrrho of Elis (360–270 BC), Greek philosopher, founder of Pyrrhonism
 Patriarch Pyrrhus of Constantinople (fl. 7th century AD), Ecumenical Patriarch of Constantinople
 Pyrros Dimas (b. 1971), Greek weightlifter and politician

Mythology
 Pyrrhus (also known as Neoptolemus), son of Achilles and Deidamia in Greek mythology
 Pyrrhus, a Phrygian man in Greek mythology

Other uses
 5283 Pyrrhus, an asteroid
 Pyrrhic, a metric foot of two short unstressed syllables
 Pyrrus, a fictional planet in the Deathworld novels

See also 
 Pyrrhic (disambiguation)
 Pyrrhias (disambiguation)
 Pirro (disambiguation)